This is a list of dinosaurs whose remains have been recovered from Australia or Antarctica.

Criteria for inclusion
The genus must appear on the List of dinosaur genera.
At least one named species of the creature must have been found in Australia or Antarctica.
This list is a complement to :Category:Dinosaurs of Australia and :Dinosaurs of Antarctica.

List of Australian and Antarctic dinosaurs

Valid genera

Invalid and potentially valid genera 

 Agrosaurus macgillivrayi: Although originally reported as being from Australia, it may actually be from Europe, possibly being synonymous with Thecodontosaurus.
 "Allosaurus robustus": Originally described as a new species of Allosaurus, but may actually represent a megaraptoran or abelisauroid.
 "Biscoveosaurus": Said to be a large ornithopod contemporary with Morrosaurus.
 Walgettosuchus woodwardi: It has been considered synonymous with Rapator, but too little is known of both genera to be certain.

Timeline
This is a timeline of selected dinosaurs from the list above.  Time is measured in Ma, megaannum, along the x-axis.

See also
 List of birds of Australia
 List of birds of Antarctica

References

Australian and Antarctic
†Dinosaurs
Dinosaurs
†Dinosuars
Articles which contain graphical timelines
†Dinosaurs
†Dinosaurs